The 2018–19 Oman Professional League is the 43rd edition of the Oman Professional League, the top football league in Oman. The season started on August 17, 2018.

Foreign players
Restricting the number of foreign players strictly to four per team, including a slot for a player from AFC countries. A team could use four foreign players on the field during each game including at least one player from the AFC country.

League table

References

Top level Omani football league seasons
2018–19 in Omani football
Oman